Multan Arts Council (established: 1975) is located in Multan city of Pakistan. Founded under the statutory provisions of the Punjab Council of Arts (PUCAR) Lahore in the year 1975 as its regional centre for the city of Multan.

Its building is located on MDA Road, Multan. It has a hall, art gallery, stage, and a garden.

Multan

Major events held
Stage dramas and performances are held here. It also holds puppet shows, painting exhibitions, sculptures and other activities. The major shows held here include:
1st Sufi Festival 2006
Sculptures of Sadiq Ali Shehzad exhibition
Textile Fashion shows 2011
International Women Day 2009
Japanese Calendar Show
Lok Mela
Fine Arts Classes Work Thesis
 Saraiki Adab Festival 2015

See also
City of Multan

Arts centres in Pakistan
A
Organisations based in Multan
1975 establishments in Pakistan
Tourist attractions in Multan
Multan Arts Council Facebook Link